was a Sōtō rōshi, the founder of the Sanbo Kyodan organization of Japanese Zen.

Biography

Ryōkō Yasutani (安谷 量衡) was born in Japan in Shizuoka Prefecture. His family was very poor, and therefore he was adopted by another family. When he was five he was sent to Fukuji-in, a small Rinzai-temple under the guidance of Tsuyama Genpo.

Yasutani saw himself becoming a Zen-priest as destined:

Yet his chances to become a Zen-priest were small, since he was not born into a temple-family.

When he was eleven he moved to Daichuji, also a Rinzai-temple. At the age of thirteen he was ordained at Teishinji, a Sōtō temple and given the name Hakuun. When he was sixteen he moved again, to Denshinji, under the guidance of Bokusan Nishiari.

Thereafter he studied with several other priests, but was also educated as a schoolteacher and became an elementary school teacher and principal. When he was thirty he married, and his wife and he eventually had five children.

He began training in 1925, when he was forty, under Harada Daiun Sogaku, a Sōtō Rōshi who had studied Zen under both Sōtō and Rinzai masters. Two years later he attained kensho, as recognized by his teacher. He finished his koan study when he was in his early fifties, and received Dharma transmission in the Soto-tradition from Harada in 1943, at age fifty-eight. He was head of a training-hall for a short time when he was at Zuigan-ji, northern Japan, but gave this up, preferring instead to train lay-practitioners.

To Yasutani's opinion Sōtō Zen practice in Japan had become rather methodical and ritualistic. Yasutani felt that practice and realization were lacking. He left the Sōtō-sect, and in 1954, when he was already 69, established Sanbō Kyōdan (Fellowship of the Three Treasures), his own organization as an independent school of Zen. After that his efforts were directed primarily toward the training of lay practitioners.

Yasutani first traveled to United States in 1962 when he was already in his seventies. He became known through the book The Three Pillars of Zen, published in 1965. It was compiled by Philip Kapleau, who started to study with Yasutani in 1956. It contains a short biography of Yasutani and his Introductory Lectures on Zen Training. The lectures were among the first instructions on how to do zazen ever published in English. The book also has Yasutani's Commentary on the Koan Mu and somewhat unorthodox reports of his dokusan interviews with Western students.

In 1970 upon his retirement Yasutani was succeeded as Kanchõ (superintendent) of the Sanbokyodan sect by Yamada Kõun. Hakuun Yasutani died on 8 March 1973.

Teaching style
The Sanbō Kyōdan incorporates Rinzai Kōan study as well as much of Soto tradition, a style Yasutani had learned from his teacher Harada Daiun Sogaku.

Yasutani placed great emphasis on kensho, initial insight into one's true nature, as a start of real practice:

To attain kensho, most students are assigned the mu-koan. After breaking through, the student first studies twenty-two "in-house" koans, which are "unpublished and not for the general public". There-after, the students goes through the Gateless Gate (Mumonkan), the Blue Cliff Record, the Book of Equanimity, the Record of Transmitting the Light, the Five Ranks and finally more than 100 Precept Koans.

Political views

Supporter of Japanese Fascism and Militarism
According to Ichikawa Hakugen, Yasutani was "a fanatical militarist and anti-communist". Brian Victoria, in his book Zen at War, places this remark in the larger context of the Meiji Restoration, which began in 1868. Japan then left its mediaeval feudal system, opening up to foreign influences and modern western technology and culture. In the wake of this process a fierce nationalism developed. It marked the constitution of the Empire of Japan, rapid industrial growth, but also the onset of offensive militarism, and the persecution of Buddhism. In reaction to these developments, Japanese Buddhism developed Buddhist modernism, but also support for the autocratic regime, as a means to survive. Victoria also suggests that Yasutani was influenced by Nazi propaganda he heard from Karlfried Graf Dürckheim during the 1940s.

Victoria has followed up his Zen at War with more research. He has directed attention to Yasutani's Zen Master Dogen and the Shushogi (Treatise on Practice and Enlightenment), published in 1943. This book is "a rallying cry for the unity of Asia under Japanese hegemony":

Responses
Victoria's treatment of the subject has stirred strong reactions and approval:

To Bodhin Kjolhede, dharma heir of Philip Kapleau, Yasutani's political views raise questions about the meaning of enlightenment:

Criticism
Victoria has been criticized for a lack of accuracy in his citation and translation of texts by Robert Baker Aitken, a Zen teacher in the Harada-Yasutani lineage, who writes:

Apologies
The book also led to a campaign by a Dutch woman who was married to a war victim:

Kubota Ji'un, "the 3rd Abbot of the Religious Foundation Sanbô Kyôdan" acknowledges Yasutani's right-wing sympathies:

Eventually, in 2000, Kubota Ji'un issued an apology for Yasutani's statements and actions during the Pacific War:

Influence
As founder of the Sanbo Kyodan, and as the teacher of Taizan Maezumi, Yasutani has been one of the most influential persons in bringing Zen practice to the west. Although the membership of the Sanbo Kyodan organization is relatively small (3,790 registered followers and 24 instructors in 1988), "the Sanbõkyõdan has had an inordinate influence on Zen in the West", and although the White Plum Asanga founded by Taizan Maezumi is independent of the Sanbo Kyodan, in some respects it perpetuates Yasutani's influence.

Bibliography
 
Dōgen Zenji to Shūshōgi (道元禅師と修證義). Tōkyō: Fujishobō, 1943

See also
Buddhism in Japan
Buddhism in the United States
Buddhism in the West
Timeline of Zen Buddhism in the United States

Notes

References

Book references

Web references

Sources

 
 
 
 
 
 The Eastern Buddhist 39/1: 61–120

External links

 Sanbo Kyodan homepage
 Sanbo Kyodan teachers and heirs

Sanbo Kyodan Buddhists
Zen Buddhist priests
Japanese Buddhist clergy
Japanese Zen Buddhists
American Zen Buddhists
American Buddhist monks
1885 births
1973 deaths
Buddhist apologists
20th-century Buddhist monks
People from Shizuoka Prefecture